Pietro Paolo Bevilacqua (born 29 June 1933 in San Marco in Lamis, Italy) is a former Australian rules footballer and soccer player.

Bevilacqua's Australian rules career was short and uneventful at the highest level but is significant for the fact he is the only known VFL/AFL footballer to have been born in Italy. His one and only game at VFL level was for Carlton against North Melbourne in Round 18 1953.

Bevilacqua played two senior games for Victorian first division football (soccer) club Juventus (now Bulleen Zebras).

In 2012, Bevilacqua was named in a celebratory Carlton international team as a follower.

References

1933 births
Living people
VFL/AFL players born outside Australia
Sportspeople from the Province of Foggia
Carlton Football Club players
Coburg Football Club players
University Blues Football Club players
Australian soccer players
Australian rules footballers from Victoria (Australia)
Australian schoolteachers
Italian emigrants to Australia
Association footballers not categorized by position